Olympic Velodrome may refer to :

 Herne Hill Velodrome, used for the 1948 Summer Olympics in London
 Helsinki Velodrome, used for the 1952 Summer Olympics in Helsinki
 Melbourne Olympic Velodrome, used for the 1956 Summer Olympics in Melbourne
 Olympic Velodrome, Rome, used for the 1960 Summer Olympics in Rome
 Hachioji Velodrome, used for the 1964 Summer Olympics in Tokyo
 Agustín Melgar Olympic Velodrome, used for the 1968 Summer Olympics in Mexico City
 Radstadion, used for the 1972 Summer Olympics in Munich
 Montreal Olympic Velodrome, used for the 1976 Summer Olympics in Montreal, now the Montreal Biodome
 Krylatskoye Sports Complex Velodrome, used for the 1980 Summer Olympics in Moscow
 Olympic Velodrome (Carson, California), used for the 1984 Summer Olympics in Los Angeles
 Olympic Velodrome (Seoul), used for the 1988 Summer Olympics in Seoul
 Velòdrom d'Horta: used for the 1992 Summer Olympics in Barcelona
 Stone Mountain Park Velodrome: used for the 1996 Summer Olympics in Atlanta
 Dunc Gray Velodrome: used for the 2000 Summer Olympics in Sydney
 Olympic Velodrome (Athens): used for the 2004 Summer Olympics in Athens
 Laoshan Velodrome: used for the 2008 Summer Olympics in Beijing
 London Velopark: used for the 2012 Summer Olympics in London
 Barra Velodrome: used for the 2016 Summer Olympics in Rio de Janeiro